An ecological corridor in Brazil is a collection of natural or semi-natural areas that link protected areas and allow gene flow between them.

Definition

The National System of Conservation Units (SNUC) law recognises ecological corridors as portions of natural or semi-natural ecosystems linking protected areas that allow gene flow and movement of biota, recolonization of degraded areas and maintenance of viable populations larger than would be possible with individual units.
The federal Ecological Corridor Project has its roots at least as far back as 1993.
It has identified seven major corridors, with focus on implementing and learning from the Central Amazon Corridor and the Central Atlantic Forest Corridor.

Examples

References

Sources

 

 
Nature conservation in Brazil
Ecological connectivity
Natural history of Brazil
Protected areas of Brazil
Types of protected area of Brazil